A piyāla, also called piola, piyola, piala (  or  ) or chini (from China) is a small ceramic bowl used throughout Central Asia for drinking tea. It is similar to the East Asian chawan. Piyālas may be used for other beverages too, such as kymyz, though traditionally a full-size bowl (called kese) is used for cold and hot beverages.

References

Teaware
Central Asian cuisine